Let's Face the Music and Dance is an album by Canadian jazz trumpeter Maynard Ferguson featuring tracks recorded in late 1960 and originally released on the Roulette label.

Reception

Allmusic awarded the album 3 stars.

Track listing
 "Let's Face the Music and Dance" (Irving Berlin) - 1:58
 "Teach Me Tonight" (Gene de Paul, Sammy Cahn) - 3:30
 "Mango's" (Dee Libbey, Sid Wayne) - 4:05
 "The Party's Over" (Jule Styne, Betty Comden, Adolph Green) - 3:42
 "It Could Happen to You" (Jimmy Van Heusen, Johnny Burke) - 2:20
 "You Don't Know What Love Is" (De Paul, Don Raye) - 2:51
 "It's Only a Paper Moon" (Harold Arlen, Yip Harburg, Billy Rose) - 2:43
 "The Masquerade Is Over" (Allie Wrubel, Herb Magidson) - 3:35
 "My Foolish Heart" (Victor Young, Ned Washington) - 2:53
 "Don't Take Your Love from Me" (Henry Nemo) - 2:54
 "Spring Is Here" (Richard Rodgers, Lorenz Hart) - 4:00
 "Let's Do It" (Cole Porter) - 3:07
Recorded in New York City on October 11, 1960 (tracks 1, 3, 6, 9 & 10), October 12, 1960 (tracks 4, 7, 8, 11 & 12) and October 14, 1960 (tracks 2 & 5)

Personnel 
Maynard Ferguson - trumpet
Chet Ferretti, Rick Kiefer, Jerry Tyree - trumpet
Slide Hampton, Kenny Rupp - trombone
Lanny Morgan - alto saxophone
Joe Farrell, Willie Maiden - tenor saxophone
Frank Hittner - baritone saxophone
Jaki Byard - piano
Charlie Sanders - bass 
Rufus Jones - drums
Joe Farrell, Slide Hampton, Willie Maiden, Don Sebesky - arrangers

References 

1960 albums
Maynard Ferguson albums
Roulette Records albums
Albums produced by Teddy Reig
Albums arranged by Slide Hampton
Albums arranged by Don Sebesky